Jan van Galenstraat metro station is a station of the Amsterdam Metro's Route 50 (Ringlijn) and Route 51. It was opened on 28 May 1997 and is named after Commodore Jan van Galen who served under the Dutch Republic. Near the station are located the OLVG West (also known as Sint Lucas Andreas Hospital), Student Hotel Amsterdam West and Sports Hall Jan van Galen. There is a Tram-stop right by the main entrance.

References

Amsterdam Metro stations
Railway stations opened in 1997